Rolling is a 2007 independent drama film about a diverse group of characters who are linked by the drug MDMA ("ecstasy"). The faux documentary takes a tough yet entertaining realistic look at how this drug affects relationships and responsibilities. The film had its world premiere at the San Francisco Independent Film Festival on February 11, 2007. It is the directorial feature debut of Billy Samoa Saleebey.

Cast
Sanoe Lake (Rain)
Garrett Brawith (Dustin)
Rachel Hardisty (Summer)
Joshua Harper (Josh)
Clinton Cargile (Clinton)
Erin Cummings (Lexa)
Angie Greenup (Sarah Willis)
Albert Rothman (Dan)
Brian Toth (Matt)
Calico Cooper (Jess)
Christine Cowden (Samantha)
Eric La Barr (Eric)

Reception 
A critic from Variety wrote that "Rolling may not live up to its billing as the first narrative feature to deal with Ecstasy usage, but it does strike an entertaining balance between boosterish 2000 indie Groove and the cautionary hysteria of direct-to-vid Rave".

See also 
 Recreational drug use
 Rave party

References

External links 
 

2007 films
2007 drama films
American drama films
2000s English-language films
2000s American films